Rivers Bridge State Historic Site, also known as Rivers Bridge State Park, located near Ehrhardt, a small town in Bamberg County, South Carolina, is the site of an important Civil War battle. It is in this area that General William T. Sherman engaged the Confederate Army on his advance from Savannah, and after two days of battle, outflanked the Confederates and forced them to withdraw.  River Bridge State Park was listed in the National Register of Historic Places on February 23, 1972.

Mass grave
In 1876 men from nearby communities reburied the Confederate dead from Rivers Bridge in a mass grave about a mile from the battlefield and began a tradition of annually commemorating the battle. The Rivers Bridge Memorial Association eventually obtained the battlefield and in 1945 turned the site over to South Carolina for a state park.

References

External links
 Rivers Bridge State Historic Site - official site

Gallery

Monuments and memorials on the National Register of Historic Places in South Carolina
1865 establishments in South Carolina
Protected areas of Bamberg County, South Carolina
South Carolina state historic sites
Buildings and structures in Bamberg County, South Carolina
National Register of Historic Places in Bamberg County, South Carolina
American Civil War on the National Register of Historic Places